Wendover Avenue is a road in Guilford County, North Carolina, United States. Most of the road is hybrid in character: it is like an expressway in that it has a mix of interchanges and traffic light-controlled intersections, but like a boulevard in that there is direct access to many of the adjacent properties; the central segment of the road is a curvy freeway. It serves as a partial loop around downtown Greensboro and a popular connector to major routes like I-40, I-73, US 421, US 29, US 220, US 70, and NC 68. It also links urban areas in the Piedmont Triad region like High Point to small communities like McLeansville.

Route description
Wendover Avenue is divided into a "West" segment and an "East" segment.

West Wendover Avenue
Wendover Avenue's western terminus is at NC 68 in High Point. From this terminus, Wendover travels northeast out of High Point past the Palladium Shopping Center. Continuing northeast as a four-lane expressway, Wendover passes a predominantly residential area. After passing a right-in/right-out interchange with Guilford College Road and an interchange with I-73, the road crosses into the Greensboro city limits and later widens to a 6–8 lane boulevard, entering the city's busiest shopping district ("The Bump"). Traffic jams are common along this stretch of road. Wendover crosses I-40 in this area; Wendover Avenue is one of I-40's busiest exits in North Carolina.

After passing exits for Spring Garden Street, Holden Road (an inverted SPUI interchange) and Market Street, Wendover comes to partial interchanges with Friendly Avenue, Green Valley Road, and Benjamin Parkway, giving access to Friendly Center.

Continuing past the exit for Westover Terrace, the freeway comes to an interchange with Battleground Avenue and US 220, where the freeway downgrades back to a boulevard with many at-grade intersections. US 220 then joins Wendover Avenue in an easterly direction (signed SOUTH 220) through northern Greensboro to a parclo interchange with US 29 and US 70 in northeast Greensboro. US 220 leaves Wendover here, heading south with US 29 south and US 70 west, but US 70 east joins Wendover here.

East Wendover Avenue
US 70 takes US 220's place, following Wendover Avenue east toward McLeansville. About  further, Burlington Road merges into US 70 and Wendover Avenue. At this point, East Wendover Avenue ends, while US 70 continues east with Burlington Road. Shortly after this intersection, US 70 has an interchange with the Future I-840 before going on to McLeansville and Burlington.

Major junctions

References

Freeways in North Carolina
High Point, North Carolina
Transportation in Greensboro, North Carolina
Transportation in Guilford County, North Carolina
U.S. Route 70
Expressways in North Carolina